Hamble Common Camp is the site of an Iron Age promontory hillfort located in Hampshire. The fort is located on Hamble common on a peninsula of land formed between Southampton Water and the River Hamble. The site was later occupied by St Andrews castle, one of the Device Forts built by King Henry VIII.

Location

References



Iron Age sites in England
Buildings and structures in Hampshire
Hill forts in Hampshire
Archaeological sites in Hampshire